Imran Sahib (born 12 October 1982) is a former Singapore international footballer.

Club career
Previously, he played for Sembawang Rangers, Woodlands Wellington, Home United & Young Lions.

His contract with Home United was not renewed for 2016 despite a good season in 2015.  He joined Gymkhana FC (IWL Club) in 2016 for leisure.

In 2017, it was reported that he had since moved to Tampines Rovers.

International career
Played 4 times for his country, he has not opened his account. Not selected since 2004.

Honours

International
Singapore
ASEAN Football Championship: 2004

References

External links

Singaporean footballers
Singapore international footballers
Tampines Rovers FC players
Living people
1982 births
Sembawang Rangers FC players
Home United FC players
Woodlands Wellington FC players
Association football defenders
Singapore Premier League players
Young Lions FC players